is a Japanese railway company on the Noto Peninsula in Ishikawa Prefecture. There are 34 trains plus sightseeing trains on the line. It previously operated the Noto Line.

Noto Railway is a third-sector company or a corporation jointly funded by private entities and local governments. Its major shareholders are Ishikawa Prefecture (33.6% ownership), Hokkoku Bank (5.0%), the Town of Noto (4.2%), Hokuriku Bank (4.2%), and others.

History 
Noto Railway formed on 30 April 1987. It opened the Noto Railway Noto Line, between Noto-Anamizu Station and Takojima Station, on 25 March 1988. It changed to the Noto Railway Nanao Line between Nanao Station and Wajima Station on 1 September 1991.

The Nanao Line between Anamizu Station and Wajima Station was discontinued on 1 April 2001. The Noto Line between Anamizu Station and Takojima Station was discontinued on 1 April 2005.

In June 2005, the railway moved its headquarters from Noto, Ishikawa to Anamizu, Ishikawa. 

The railway company collaborated with the anime television series, Hanasaku Iroha, between 2011 and 2012. This collaboration was renewed in 2013.

References

External links 

Noto Railway Official twitter
Noto Railway Official Facebook

Railway companies of Japan
Rail transport in Ishikawa Prefecture